George Cotton (1813–1866) was an English bishop and educator in India.

George Cotton may also refer to:
 George W. Cotton (1821–1892), South Australia politician
 George Cotton (courtier) (1505–1545), usher to Henry, Duke of Richmond, and brother of Sir Richard Cotton
 George Cotton (priest) (1743–1805), English Anglican priest

See also
 George Radcliffe Colton (1865–1916), Governor of Puerto Rico